Thomas Witter Jackson was Chief Justice of Jamaica from 1818 to 1821.

References 

Chief justices of Jamaica
Year of birth missing
Year of death missing
19th-century Jamaican judges